Cotabato's at-large congressional district may refer to several instances when a provincewide at-large district was used for elections to Philippine national legislatures from the formerly undivided province of Cotabato before 1987.

The single-member district was first created ahead of the 1935 Philippine legislative election following the 1934 constitutional convention where voters in the province had been selected in electing a delegate for Cotabato. Cotabato had been admitted as a special province under the Department of Mindanao and Sulu since 1914 but was only previously represented through a multi-member delegation appointed by the Governor General covering all of Mindanao territory except Misamis and Surigao beginning in 1916. The district encompassed the entire territory formerly known as the Cotabato District that was previously organized under Moro Province in 1903 from the same Spanish politico-military district (Distrito Quinto de Cotabato) that existed since 1860. The Spanish district was earlier represented in the Malolos Congress of the nascent First Philippine Republic by two delegates from Luzon.

Datu Balabaran Sinsúat of the Nacionalista Demócrata Pro-Independencia was elected as the single-member district's first representative in 1935 by a select group of electors composed of municipal and municipal district presidents, vice-presidents and councilors, among others. The first time a representative from the province was elected through popular vote was during the succeeding 1938 Philippine legislative election after the passage of Commonwealth Act No. 44 in 1936 which removed the restrictions on qualified voters in the former Bureau of Non-Christian Tribes-designated jurisdiction.

Cotabato was also represented as a plural member constituency in the Second Republic National Assembly during the Pacific War. It reverted to single-member representation for the restored Commonwealth and Third Republic House of Representatives and continued to elect representatives even after 13 of its southern municipalities separated to form the province of South Cotabato in 1966. Following a shift to parliamentary system, districts were replaced by multi-member regional constituencies where Cotabato, further reduced and split into three provinces in 1973, was represented as part of Region XII's at-large district. When provincial and city district representation was restored in 1984, North Cotabato, which assumed the original Cotabato name, was represented by two delegates.

The district was dissolved after the province was apportioned two seats under the 1987 constitution.

Representation history

See also
Legislative districts of Cotabato

References

Former congressional districts of the Philippines
Politics of Cotabato
1898 establishments in the Philippines
1935 establishments in the Philippines
1972 disestablishments in the Philippines
1984 establishments in the Philippines
1986 disestablishments in the Philippines
At-large congressional districts of the Philippines
Congressional districts of Soccsksargen
Constituencies established in 1898
Constituencies disestablished in 1901
Constituencies established in 1935
Constituencies disestablished in 1972
Constituencies established in 1984
Constituencies disestablished in 1986